Up Nately is a small village in Hampshire, England, located to the south east of Basingstoke. Its nearest railway station is in Hook, three miles to the east of the village. The Basingstoke Canal runs through the village from the former Penny Bridge (on the Greywell Road) in the west, under Brick Kiln Bridge (Blackstocks Lane), Slades Bridge (Heather Lane) and Eastrop Bridge (Heather Row Lane), and, to the east of the village, through the collapsed Greywell Tunnel.

History
Originally part of the Great Manor of Mapledurwell, Up Nately was created as a separate estate in the early part of the 12th century, when it was granted to the Cistercian Abbey of Tiron in France by Adam de Port, Lord of Mapledurwell and confirmed by Henry I. Tiron sent a colony of Benedictine monks to settle in its new estate, which became Andwell Priory. As an alien priory with an allegiance to a foreign enemy, it was sequestered by Edward III. It was bought in 1391 by William of Wykeham, Bishop of Winchester who then bestowed it on Winchester College. Remains of the priory can be seen today. 

In 1535 Corpus Christi College, Oxford, also acquired some land in the village in Heather Row Lane, together with the grant of the manor of Mapledurwell. 

In 1870-72, John Marius Wilson's Imperial Gazetteer of England and Wales described Up Nately as:

 

For many centuries farming has been the dominant activity in the village, although there have been periods of industrial activity such as cloth production in the 15th and 16th century and brick making at the end of the 19th century. There are a number of chalk and sand pits in fields surrounding the village, indicating historic quarrying activity.

Brickmaking

In 1897 Sir Frederick Seager Hunt, a Conservative Party politician and distiller, who two years earlier had bought the Basingstoke Canal, invested £20,000 to set up the Hampshire Brick and Tile Company on 32 acres of land in Up Nately. Hunt's aim was to revive trade in the upper reaches of the canal and in particular use the canal to supply bricks from the brickworks to replace the wooden huts at the Aldershot Garrison. Bricks from Up Nately were also supplied to local builders in towns along the Canal and accounted for half of the traffic in bricks using the canal. To fire the kiln, about fifty tons of coal per week were supplied by barge from Basingstoke. 

However, the business did not prove to be viable. Sir Frederick sold his shares in the company and the company went into receivership by 1901. The site was used by the Nately Pottery Company from 1901 to 1908. Some of the brickworks buildings remained until the 1940s and the Kiln Chimney was demolished during the Second World War. 

The arches of two kilns and some sheds from the brick works remain in Heather Lane, along with the Brickyard Arm which was a short 100 metre long branch off the main canal where bricks were loaded onto the barges. The name of Brick Kiln Bridge in the village is a legacy of the brickworks.

Governance
In 1880 Up Nately became a civil parish of 1,149 acres. In 1932 it merged, along with its neighbouring parish of Andwell, with Mapledurwell to form the current civil parish of Mapledurwell and Up Nately and part of the Basing ward of Basingstoke and Deane borough council. The borough council is a Non-metropolitan district of Hampshire County Council.

Conservation Area
The southern part of the village lies within the Up Nately Conservation Area. This was designated in 1981 by Basingstoke and Deane Borough Council in recognition of the special architectural and historic interest of the village.

Local Nature Reserve

Since the partial collapse of the Greywell Tunnel in the 1930s, the last five miles of the Basingstoke Canal from the tunnel to Basingstoke has remained isolated from the rest of the canal. Whilst most of this section has been drained, the part between the western end of the Greywell Tunnel and Penny Bridge in Up Nately still has water in it and has been preserved by the Basingstoke Canal Authority as the Up Nately Local Nature Reserve.

The Reserve, which has an area of 2.83 hectares (6.9 acres) and is part of Butter Wood Site of Special Scientific Interest, supports the following wildlife: Coot, Moorhen, Mallard Duck, Little Grebe, Ruddy Darter, Water Vole, Ransoms and Badgers. The Greywell Tunnel is an important hibernation site for bat species including the Pipistrelle, Natterer and Daubenton. The rare Barbastelle bat has also been recorded there. 

Penny Bridge marks the start of a public footpath eastwards along the length of the Canal's former towpath. However the Basingstoke Canal Society, working with local authorities, aims to open up a foot and cycle path to the west which would, as close as possible, follow the route of the canal from Penny Bridge to Basingstoke.

St Stephen's Church
St Stephen's Church dates from around 1200, with 15th and 19th century alterations and is Grade II* listed.

The church includes a memorial to Alfred James Clark. Clark had joined the Army in 1914. In 1916, the hospital where he had been a patient was bombed. When erected, the memorial was unusual, being the second such one-man memorial in the UK.

The altar cloth has a mysterious inscription to the fallen of the Great War. It lists sixteen names of servicemen who are from different regiments, different parts of the country, and who died in different places. The association between them is unclear.

The churchyard contains the war graves of Frank Evans and Alan Sidney Woodbridge.

Further reading
 Friends of St Stephen's St Stephen's Church Up Nately (church guide, available from the church)

References

External links

 Mapledurwell and Up Nately Parish Council
 British History Online: Up Nately
 Up Nately Conservation Area Appraisal and Conservation Area Map
 Listed Buildings in Mapledurwell And Up Nately, Hampshire, England
 Hampshire Treasures: Volume 2 (Basingstoke and Deane) pages 177, 179, 180, 181, 182, 183, 184, and 185

St Stephens Church
 Stained Glass Windows at St. Stephen Up Nately, Hampshire

Villages in Hampshire